Street Machine may refer to:

 Street Machine (magazine), an Australian automotive magazine
 Street Machine (album), a 1979 album by Sammy Hagar